Baraundha (also known as Pathar Kachhar) was a princely state of colonial India, located in modern Satna district of Madhya Pradesh. Although historically far larger, at the time of Indian independence in 1950, it was a saluted state of 9 guns.

History
The ruling family were members of the Raghuvanshi clan of Rajputs.
Maharaja Raghubar Dayal Singh entitled "His Highness" and salute of  "9 Guns" in 1877 at imperial assemblage of British.

Rulers

1790 -  4 Jan 1827          Mohan Singh                        (d. 1827) 
1827 - 1867                 Sarabjit Singh                     (d. 1867)
1874 - 1885                 Raghubar Dayal Singh               (b. 1840 - d. 1885) ( Raja Bahadur from 1 Jan 1877) 
18 Aug 1886 -  8 Jul 1908   Maharaja Ram Pratap Singh                       (b. 1847 - d. 1908)

Rajas  
1908 - 1933                 Gaya Prasad Singh                  (b. 1865 - d. 1933)           
1933 - 15 Aug 1947          Ram Pratap Singh last ruler of the state

See also
Political integration of India
Vindhya Pradesh

References

Princely states of India
Satna district
Rajputs
12th-century establishments in India
1169 establishments in Asia
1950 disestablishments in India